SCV may refer to:

Companies and organizations
 Santa Clara Vanguard Drum and Bugle Corps, California, US
 Sons of Confederate Veterans, non-profit based in the US
 StarHub Cable Vision, Singaporean cable TV
 Sumangali Cable Vision, Indian cable TV

Transportation
 Vehicle registration plates of Vatican City
 Small Commercial Vehicle, a vehicle segment in India
 Suceava International Airport  (IATA code), 
 Special Category Visa, for New Zealanders in Australia
 Vatican City international postal code, SCV-00120

Other uses
 Santa Clarita Valley, California, US
 Function of several complex variables, This field of mathematics is called several complex variables and is often abbreviated as SCV
 Squared coefficient of variation in statistics